Rodrigo Antonio Pereira Pereira (born 10 May 1982) is a Chilean footballer. His last club was Lota Schwager.

External links
 Profile at BDFA
 

1982 births
Living people
Chilean footballers
Primera B de Chile players
Chilean Primera División players
Naval de Talcahuano footballers
Rangers de Talca footballers
Magallanes footballers
Curicó Unido footballers
Puerto Montt footballers
Unión La Calera footballers
Ñublense footballers
Association football forwards